Ludovico Ludovisi (22 or 27 October 1595 – 18 November 1632) was an Italian cardinal and statesman of the Roman Catholic Church. He was an art connoisseur who formed a famous collection of antiquities, housed at the Villa Ludovisi in Rome.

Biography

Ludovico Ludovisi was born in Bologna, then part of the Papal States, the son of Orazio Ludovisi and Lavinia Albergati. Following in the footsteps of his uncle Alessandro Ludovisi, he was trained at the Jesuit Collegio Germanico of Rome, and went on to the University of Bologna, where he received his doctorate in canon law on 25 February 1615.

When Alessandro Ludovisi was acclaimed pope, taking the name Gregory XV, Ludovico was made cardinal the day after his coronation, though he was only 25. The following month he was made archbishop of Bologna though he remained in Rome. His uncle had great faith in his judgement and energy and was in need of a strong and able assistant to help govern the Papal States (the Pope was, after all, in his late 60s). On the same day, Orazio Ludovisi, Ludovico's father, was put at the head of the pontifical army. Gregory XV was not disappointed in his nephew. As the Catholic Encyclopedia avers: 

He was sent as legate in Fermo in 1621 and in Avignon, 1621–1623. He served briefly as Camerlengo of the Holy Roman Church (19 April 1621 to 7 June 1623).

In August 1623, Ludovisi participated in the papal conclave that elected Pope Urban VIII. Due to conflict with the new pope's family, Ludovisi was forced to leave Rome.

He continued, however, as prefect of the sacred consulta of the Propaganda Fide (1622 to 1632) and Vice-Chancellor of the Holy Roman Church (1623 to 1632). He died in Bologna in 1632.

Patron of the arts
Cardinal Ludovisi is remembered as a connoisseur and patron of arts. He paid for the construction of the Jesuit Chiesa di Sant'Ignazio and Palazzo Ludovisi (now Palazzo Montecitorio), where Gian Lorenzo Bernini was his architect. He rapidly assembled from private owners and the Carmelite brothers of Santa Maria in Traspontina a holding of vineyards and small plots to create the Villa Ludovisi, a vast complex of gardens and buildings on the Monte Pincio near Porta Pinciana, in the so-called "Gardens of Sallust" on the site where Julius Caesar and his heir, Augustus, had had their villas. The Ludovisi Ares, a spectacular discovery of 1622, found its way quickly to the collection.  He employed Alessandro Algardi to restore other finds, some of which were unearthed in the grounds of the Villa itself. The sculpture was lightly restored by Bernini and joined the Dying Gaul in the Cardinal's gallery. The Ludovisi collection was enlarged with purchases from Cardinal Altemps' collection, all housed at the splendid  Villa Ludovisi, which he surrounded with gardens.  Guercino painted frescoes at the villa, and Cardinal Ludovisi's house poet was Alessandro Tassoni.

At the casino of the Villa, Cardinal Ludovisi employed Carlo Maderno to rebuild a simple house further up the hill. In a small ground-floor gallery of the casino, Guercino frescoed a ceiling with his Chariot of Aurora (1621–1623). It remains one of the most famous painted decors of Rome.

His cousin, Niccolò Albergati-Ludovisi, was made cardinal in 1645.

Episcopal succession

References 

1595 births
1632 deaths
Ludovico Cardinal
17th-century Italian cardinals
Cardinal-nephews
Roman Catholic archbishops of Bologna
17th-century Italian Roman Catholic archbishops
Cardinal Secretaries of State
Members of the Congregation for the Propagation of the Faith
Camerlengos of the Holy Roman Church
Clergy from Bologna